The superior transverse ligament (transverse or suprascapular ligament) converts the suprascapular notch into a foramen or opening.

It is a thin and flat fascicle, narrower at the middle than at the extremities, attached by one end to the base of the coracoid process and by the other to the medial end of the scapular notch.

The suprascapular nerve always runs through the foramen; while the suprascapular vessels cross over the ligament in most of the cases.

The suprascapular ligament can become completely or partially ossified.  The ligament also been found to split forming doubled space within the suprascapular notch.

References

External links
 

Ligaments of the upper limb